Brandon Smith Rivera Vargas (born 21 March 1996) is a Colombian professional racing cyclist, who currently rides for UCI WorldTeam . In October 2020, he was named in the startlist for the 2020 Vuelta a España.

Major results
2014
 1st  Team (with Jhon Anderson Rodríguez), Youth Olympic Games 
2017
 4th Road race, Games of the Small States of Europe
2018 
 3rd Time trial National Under-23 Road Championships
2019 
 1st  Time trial, Pan American Road Championships
 4th Time trial, Pan American Games
2020
 4th Time trial, National Road Championships
2022
 6th Overall CRO Race
2023
 5th Overall Vuelta a San Juan

Grand Tour general classification results timeline

References

External links

1996 births
Living people
Colombian male cyclists
Youth Olympic gold medalists for Colombia
Cyclists at the 2014 Summer Youth Olympics
Pan American Games competitors for Colombia
Cyclists at the 2019 Pan American Games
People from Zipaquirá
21st-century Colombian people